Dragon Fly is the debut album by Jefferson Starship, released on Grunt Records in 1974. It peaked at No. 11 on the Billboard 200, and has been certified a gold album. Credited to Grace Slick, Paul Kantner, and Jefferson Starship, the band itself was a turning point after a series of four albums centering on the partnership of Kantner and Slick during the disintegration of Jefferson Airplane through the early 1970s.

The album received its RIAA gold certification within six months, selling as well as most Jefferson Airplane albums. Two singles were released from the album: "Ride the Tiger" reached #84 on the Billboard Hot 100; the follow-up single "Caroline" failed to chart. Singer Marty Balin, who had not appeared on an Airplane or Airplane-offshoot album since Volunteers in 1969, would write and sing on the single "Caroline." He would join Jefferson Starship soon after, and remain with the band until 1978. The song "Hyperdrive" was used in the opening ceremonies of the 1976 World Science Fiction Convention, MidAmeriCon, in Kansas City, Missouri.

Track listing

Charts

Personnel
Grace Slick – lead (3, 5, 8) and backing vocals; piano (3)
Paul Kantner – lead (1, 7) and backing vocals, rhythm guitar
David Freiberg – lead (2, 6) and backing vocals, keyboards (1, 2, 4), piano (5, 6), organ (7, 8), bass (2)
Papa John Creach – electric violin (1, 2, 5-8)
Craig Chaquico – lead guitar
Pete Sears – bass (1, 3-8), piano (2, 4, 7 ,8), harpsichord (4, 8), backing vocals
John Barbata – drums, percussion
Marty Balin – lead vocals (4)
Production
Jefferson Starship – producer
Larry Cox – producer, engineer
Pat Ieraci (Maurice) – production coordinator
Steve Mantoani – recordist
Paul Dowell – amp consultant
Bill Thompson – manager
Acy Lehman, Frank Mulvey – art directors
Peter Lloyd – illustration
Recorded and Mixed at Wally Heider's, San Francisco

References

1974 debut albums
Albums recorded at Wally Heider Studios
Grace Slick albums
Grunt Records albums
Jefferson Starship albums
Paul Kantner albums